Valentin Adama Diomande (born 14 February 1990) is a Norwegian professional footballer who currently plays as a striker for Toronto FC in Major League Soccer. He has previously played for Lyn, Skeid, Hødd, Strømsgodset, Dinamo Minsk, Stabæk, Hull City, Los Angeles FC, Cangzhou Mighty Lions, Al-Sailiya, Al-Arabi, and Odd.

Early life
Diomande was born in Oslo to parents from the Ivory Coast. He played youth football for the clubs Holmlia, Vålerenga, and Lyn. He has attended the sport secondary school Norges Toppidrettsgymnas, like most of Lyn's young players. He initially studied sports science at Ulsrud High School.

Career 

Diomande made his senior debut on 19 October 2008 against Hamarkameratene, as a substitute in the 86th minute. He played one more game in 2008 and one in 2009. Ahead of the 2010 season he joined Skeid.

On 26 March 2015, Diomande signed a 2.5-year contract with Stabæk. Playing for head coach Bob Bradley in 2015, Diomande had his most productive season to date, scoring 25 goals in 26 appearances.

On 1 September 2015, Diomande joined English club Hull City of the Championship for a fee of £1.7 million. Because of injury, he had to wait until 12 December 2015 to make his debut when he came off the bench as a 77th-minute replacement for Chuba Akpom, in a 1–0 home win against Bolton Wanderers. Diomande made his Premier League debut on 13 August 2016, scoring a spectacular overhead kick in a shock 2–1 defeat of reigning champions Leicester City.

On 1 May 2018, Diomande signed with Major League Soccer club Los Angeles FC, reuniting him with Bradley in his first season at LAFC. Diomande made an immediate impact, scoring nine goals in his first seven league contests and being named MLS Player of the Month in his first full month on the squad.

On August 13, 2020, Diomande released a statement on Twitter that he was terminating his contract with LAFC "with immediate effect" for family reasons.

On 2 April 2021, Diomande joined Chinese club Cangzhou Mighty Lions.

On 8 August 2021, Diomande joined Qatari club Al-Sailiya.

In January 2023, he joined Toronto FC. Diomande made his debut for the club starting in a 3-2 loss at DC United in the season opener on February 25, 2023.

International career
Diomande received his first international call-up to the senior team in June 2015, making his debut for the senior team on 12 June when he came on as a substitute for Joshua King in the 79th minute of a goalless UEFA Euro 2016 qualifying draw against Azerbaijan at Ullevaal Stadion.

Career statistics

Club

International
As of 10 June 2018.

International goals
Scores and results list Norway's goal tally first.

Honours
Strømsgodset
Tippeligaen: 2013

Los Angeles FC
Supporters' Shield: 2019

Individual
 MLS Player of the Month: June 2018

References

External links

 

1990 births
Living people
Footballers from Oslo
Norwegian people of Ivorian descent
Norwegian footballers
Holmlia SK players
Lyn Fotball players
Skeid Fotball players
IL Hødd players
Strømsgodset Toppfotball players
FC Dinamo Minsk players
Hull City A.F.C. players
Los Angeles FC players
Cangzhou Mighty Lions F.C. players
Al-Sailiya SC players
Al-Arabi SC (Qatar) players
Eliteserien players
Norwegian First Division players
Premier League players
Chinese Super League players
Qatar Stars League players
Norwegian expatriate footballers
Expatriate footballers in Belarus
Expatriate footballers in England
Expatriate footballers in China
Expatriate footballers in Qatar
Norwegian expatriate sportspeople in Belarus
Norwegian expatriate sportspeople in China
Norwegian expatriate sportspeople in Qatar
Norway international footballers
Association football forwards
Stabæk Fotball players
English Football League players
Expatriate soccer players in the United States
Major League Soccer players
Toronto FC players